Grave Mistake is a detective novel by Ngaio Marsh; it is the thirtieth novel to feature Roderick Alleyn, and was first published in 1978.  The plot concerns the supposed suicide of a wealthy widow in a chic rest spa, and involves a rare, and famous, postage stamp. Set in and around the fictional village of Upper Quintern in England's Weald of Kent, it is the last of Marsh's "cosy" English village mysteries, and was followed by Photo Finish (1980), her final novel set in New Zealand, and Light Thickens (1982), her final novel with a theatrical setting. The book was well received and sold extremely well, as the author wrote in 1979 to a friend: "Grave Mistake seems to be beating all records in the U.S.A. It has sold 22,000 copies... & [is] still going strong" (quoted in Joanne Drayton's biography).

Plot synopsis 
At an amusingly described Women's Institute meeting in Quintern Place, the beautiful home of The Hon. Sybil Foster, a wealthy widow, we meet or hear of the characters who populate the idyllic Kentish village of Upper Quintern: Sybil's childhood friend, Verity Preston (a West End playwright), their daily 'help' Mrs Jim Jobbin and gardener Angus McBride, the vicar, the local GP and so on. Sybil and Verity both live in houses inherited from their fathers. The "rhythms of life" of this highly traditional, class-structured community are described as having changed little "in spite of war, bombs, crises and inflation"  except for the arrival of Nikolas Markos, a suave, exotic multi-millionaire, who has bought and extravagantly refurbished the nearby Mardling Manor. At a dinner party, Markos introduces another outsider, Dr Basil Schramm, newly arrived medical incumbent at Greengages Hotel, a classy, expensive health retreat, where Sybil Foster is a frequent guest. Verity is disconcerted to recognise Schramm as Basil Smythe, a former medical student of her father's, who had seduced and then dropped her 25 years previously.

The next outsiders to arrive are Bruce Gardener, a strapping ex-soldier with a whimsically ersatz Scottish persona and accent, whose services as a skilled gardener are in great demand following the sudden death of Mr McBride, then Claude Carter, Sybil's stepson by her first marriage, an unprepossessing remittance man and petty criminal, newly returned from Australia with the police on his trail. Sybil has taken herself off to Greengages, where she receives visits from most of the cast of suspects, including her pretty daughter Prunella, recently engaged to Markos' handsome son Gideon. That evening, Sybil is found dead in her hotel room, apparently having committed suicide with an overdose of barbiturate pills taken in whisky. A final suspect is the hotel's luscious Sister Jackson (who puts Alleyn privately in mind of TV comedian Dick Emery's character 'Mandy') who is jealous of her lover Basil Schramm's burgeoning intimacy with Sybil.

When Sybil's newly revised will appears, its dispositions prove shockingly unexpected, and the resulting suspicions bring Scotland Yard to Quintern and Greengages, in the persons of Chief Superintendent Roderick Alleyn, Detective-Inspector Fox and their usual scene-of-crime team of Thompson (photography) and Bailey (fingerprints). There is no shortage of suspects with motives for murder, and in the background lurks the 'Black Alexander' (a priceless postage stamp), which disappeared when Sybil's first husband Maurice Carter was killed in a bombed train, returning from Quintern Place to London during the War. Was this treasure on his person when he died, or did he maybe hide it for safety somewhere about Quintern Place?

Background and commentary 
Marsh's first biographer, Margaret Lewis suggests that, once again, the author's depiction of Quintern drew on her visits to the Rhodes family (lifelong friends) in the Kentish village of Birling, quoting Marsh's admission that "Birling has a strong tendency to pop up when least expected" and a letter in which Marsh regrets that "however much I try to discipline myself as to plot and general whodunnitry, I always find myself writing about a set of people in a milieu that, for one reason or another, attracts me. And then... I have to involve them in some crime or other. Does this mean one is a straight novelist manquée?". Later biographer Joanne Drayton  also comments on the struggles Marsh faced with a book she described in a letter to her agent Edmund Cork as having "hung round my neck like the Ancient Mariner's Albatross" and "been interrupted so often by illness". These struggles to complete, revise and proof-read Grave Mistake find a parallel in her appealing (and surely, autobiographical?) protagonist, Verity Preston, a writer struggling to revise a play for hopeful West End production in the face of constant interruptions and worries. Asked (page 10) if "you look on us all as raw material", Verity reflects that "in fact, she had been wondering at that very moment if she could build a black comedy round Upper Quintern ingredients"... which is precisely what Ngaio Marsh accomplishes in her final "village cosy": a black comedy of English manners in the traditional Golden Age Whodunnit's setting of the classic Home Counties village, so aptly dubbed "Mayhem Parva" in crime writer Colin Watson's Snobbery With Violence: Crime Stories and Their Audiences.

References 

Roderick Alleyn novels
1978 British novels
Collins Crime Club books